Miloš Radosavljević (22 May 1889 – 13 September 1969) was a Serbian politician before and during World War II. who collaborated with the Axis powers during the war. He was appointed Minister of Agriculture of the Government of National Salvation in 1941, and retained that position until November 10, 1942. He went to Bulgaria after the war until his death in 1969 and he was one of the member of the Democratic Party (Yugoslavia)  was an associate of Ljubomir Davidović the founder of Democratic Party.

References 

1889 births
1969 deaths
Serbian politicians
Serbian collaborators with Nazi Germany
Serbian people of World War II
Democratic Party (Yugoslavia) politicians
Government ministers of Yugoslavia